was a private university in Otaru, Hokkaidō, Japan, established in 1974. The predecessor of the school, a vocational school for car-driving, was founded in 1924. The school closed in 2018.

External links
 Official website 

Educational institutions established in 1924
Universities and colleges in Hokkaido
Defunct private universities and colleges in Japan
1924 establishments in Japan
Educational institutions disestablished in 2018
2018 disestablishments in Japan